is a Japanese actress.

Biography
Ohgo was born in Zama, Kanagawa. She began acting in 2000 when she was seven, then joined Sunflower (Himawari), a theatrical company. She debuted with the company at the Meiji-za in Story of a National Thief.

In early 2005, Ohgo debuted in her first major film, directed by Isao Yukisada,  with Ken Watanabe, where she played the role of Tae Komatsubara. In December 2005, she debuted in Hollywood with Memoirs of a Geisha, directed by Rob Marshall, where she played Sakamoto Chiyo, the child version of the main protagonist Nitta Sayuri (the adult version is played by Chinese actress Zhang Ziyi). During the same year, she also won the Japan Film Critics Award for Best Newcomer.

In 2008, she began lending her voice to anime in Michiko to Hatchin as Hana (AKA: "Hatchin"). She also provided the voice Kaita in Professor Layton and the Diabolical Box.

She worked at CATARMAN until 2013.

Filmography

Film
 (2003)

Memoirs of a Geisha (2005)
 (2006)
 (2007)
 (2008)
Kamui Gaiden (カムイ外伝) (2008)
The Kirishima Thing (2012)
The Mourner (2015)
Oh Lucy! (2017)
I Was a Secret Bitch (2019)
Happy Island (2019)

TV drama
 (2002, Nippon TV)
 (2002, Fuji TV)
 (2003–04, Fuji TV)
 (2003, NHK)
 (2004, Fuji TV)
 (2005, TBS)
 (2006, Fuji TV)
 (2006, Fuji TV)
 (2007, Nippon TV)
(2007, Fuji TV)
(2007, Fuji TV)
(2008, NHK)
(2008, Fuji TV)
 (2009, Nippon TV)
 (2018, Nippon TV)

Anime
Michiko to Hacchin (2008, Fuji TV)

Video games
Professor Layton and the Diabolical Box (Katia Anderson)

Commercials
SoftBank (SoftBank Mobile: Vodafone Japan) 
Iris Ohyama

References

External links

 Official profile at Alpha Agency
 

Japanese stage actresses
Japanese television actresses
Japanese film actresses
Japanese voice actresses
People from Zama, Kanagawa
Actresses from Kanagawa Prefecture
1993 births
Living people
Japanese child actresses
21st-century Japanese actresses
Keio University alumni